Charles Philippe of Croÿ (1 September 1549 – 23 November 1613 in Burgundy), Marquis of Havré, was a military and politician from the Southern Netherlands.

Life 
He was the son of Philippe II de Croÿ and his second wife Anna of Lorraine. His godfathers were King Charles V and his son, the future King Philip II of Spain.

He fought under the Duke of Alba against William the Silent in 1568 and one year later under King Charles IX of France against the Huguenots. He was seriously wounded in the Battle of Moncontour and was treated in the castle of Havré by Ambroise Paré. Charles Philippe was a confidant of King Philip II and became a member of the Council of State in the Low Countries. In 1576 he tried in vain to stop the Sack of Antwerp. In 1577 he defected to the Union of Brussels and was awarded by the rebels with the post of Ambassador in England.

In 1579 he was on a mission in Artois with Adolf van Meetkercke, when he defected back to the camp of King Philip II. He was pardoned, but remained inactive for the next 8 years. In 1587 he was sent with a military expedition to help his cousin Charles III, Duke of Lorraine. He became also member of the Council of State again, and was a loyal supporter of the Absolutist policy of the King.

In 1594, he was sent by Archduke Ernest of Austria to the Imperial Diet at Regensburg as representative of the Burgundian Circle, and became Prince of the Holy Empire. in 1599, he became a Knight in the Order of the Golden Fleece.

Family
Charles Philippe in 1570 married Diane de Dommartin (1552–1625). Their offspring were:
 Charles Alexandre de Croÿ, Marquis d’Havré (1574–1624)
 Dorothea of Croÿ (1575–1662), married her cousin Charles III de Croÿ
 Ernst of Croÿ (1583–1620), married Anna of Pomerania in 1619, father of Ernst Bogislaw von Croÿ.
 Christina of Croÿ (1591–1664), married Philipp Otto of Salm-Salm, killed in the Battle of Nördlingen (1634).

References

Sources

External links
Genealogy, geneanet.org

1549 births
1613 deaths
Charles Phillippe
Dutch people of the Eighty Years' War (Spanish Empire)
Knights of the Golden Fleece